Niditinea truncicolella is a moth of the family Tineidae. It was described by Johan Martin Jakob von Tengström in 1848. It is found in Spain, Germany, Switzerland, the Czech Republic, Slovakia, Estonia, Latvia, Norway, Sweden, Finland and Russia.

The wingspan is 9–13 mm. Adults have been recorded on wing from June to July.

References

 "Niditinea truncicolella (Tengstrom, 1848)". Insecta.pro. Retrieved February 5, 2020.

Moths described in 1848
Tineinae
Moths of Europe